The 1976 United States presidential election in Iowa took place on November 2, 1976, as part of the 1976 United States presidential election. Voters chose eight representatives, or electors, to the Electoral College, who voted for president and vice president.

Iowa was won by incumbent President Gerald Ford (R–Michigan). with 49.47 percent of the popular vote, against Jimmy Carter (D–Georgia), with 48.46 percent, making Iowa about 3% more Republican than the nation-at-large. This race was one of the tightest in the nation, with the two candidates being separated by just 1.01 percent and a mere thirteen thousand votes. None of the third-party candidates amounted to a significant portion of the vote, but Eugene McCarthy (NBP–Minnesota) won 1.57 percent of the popular vote and came third overall in the nation.

Despite losing in Iowa, Carter went on to win the national election and became the 39th president of the United States. This was the last time until 2020 that a Democrat was elected President without carrying the state of Iowa.

This is the third most recent election in which Iowa voted for a different candidate than Wisconsin, a phenomenon that has only been repeated twice since, in 2004, and 2020.

Results

Results by county

See also
 United States presidential elections in Iowa

References

Iowa
1976
1976 Iowa elections